Rudolph G. Penner (born 1936 in Amherstburg, Ontario) is a Canadian-American economist who was the director of the United States Congressional Budget Office from September 1, 1983, through April 28, 1987.

Penner attained a bachelor's degree in economics from the University of Toronto. He enrolled in Johns Hopkins University and earned a doctorate in the discipline. He subsequently entered academia, receiving a professorship at the University of Rochester, where he concentrated on tax policy.

After joining the Office of Management & Budget, Penner rose to become the agency's chief economist during the Ford administration. Previous federal posts included stints as deputy assistant secretary for economic affairs with the U.S. Department of Housing & Urban Development and senior staff economist for the Council of Economic Advisors. In 1977, he left government to take a fellowship with the American Enterprise Institute. At the time of his appointment as head of the CBO, he expressed interest in shifting toward consumption-based taxes and working toward reduction of the federal deficit.

Penner later worked as director of the Barents Group consulting firm. He currently works as a fellow at the Urban Institute. He also serves on the board of directors of the Committee for a Responsible Federal Budget.

References

External links

1936 births
American civil servants
Canadian emigrants to the United States
Directors of the Congressional Budget Office
Johns Hopkins University alumni
Living people
People from Amherstburg, Ontario
United States Department of Housing and Urban Development officials
United States Office of Management and Budget officials
University of Toronto alumni